Barbodes xouthos is a species of freshwater ray-finned fish from the carp and minnow family Cyprinidae. It has only been recorded from Brunei on the island of Borneo. It has an unusual pattern on its body consisting of a plain brown body with faint reticulations.

References

Barbodes
Freshwater fish of Borneo
Endemic fauna of Brunei
Endemic fauna of Borneo
Fish described in 2011
Taxa named by Maurice Kottelat
Taxa named by Heok Hui Tan